Douglas Lambert Burke (born March 30, 1957) is a former water polo player who won a silver medal for the United States at the 1984 Summer Olympics in Los Angeles, California.

Burke was born in Modesto, California. He played collegiately for Stanford University and he has an MBA from the University of California, Los Angeles. In 1994, he was inducted into the USA Water Polo Hall of Fame.

See also
 List of Olympic medalists in water polo (men)

References

External links
 

1957 births
Living people
Stanford Cardinal men's water polo players
UCLA Anderson School of Management alumni
Olympic silver medalists for the United States in water polo
Place of birth missing (living people)
American male water polo players
Medalists at the 1984 Summer Olympics
Water polo players at the 1984 Summer Olympics